New York State Route 198 (NY 198) is a state highway located entirely within the city of Buffalo, New York, in the United States. It is named the Scajaquada Expressway for Scajaquada Creek, which it covers as it heads across northern Buffalo. NY 198 connects the Niagara Thruway (Interstate 190 or I-190) in the Black Rock neighborhood to the Kensington Expressway (NY 33) on Buffalo's east side, dividing the city's premier public park in half.

Route description

NY 198 begins at exit 11, a semi-directional T-interchange, of I-190 in the Black Rock section in the city of Buffalo, alongside the Niagara River. NY 198 proceeds northeastward as the Scajaquada Expressway, a four-lane expressway through Buffalo. Just after the interchange, the route crosses over NY 266 (Niagara Street) and westbound serves an interchange with NY 266 and NY 265. NY 198 winds northeast into the West Side of Buffalo, approaching the campus of Buffalo State College as it enters an interchange with Grant Street, accessible from both directions. At this interchange, NY 198 bends eastward along the northern edge of campus, passing Coyer Field, Moore Complex, and several residence halls as it bends southeast alongside the campus. 

Now in the Elmwood Village section of Buffalo, NY 198 bends eastward once again and provides a four-way interchange with access to Elmwood Avenue and the nearby Albright-Knox Art Gallery and Buffalo History Museum. After the interchange, NY 198 enters Delaware Park, passes Hoyt Lake, then encounters a four-way interchange with NY 384 (Delaware Avenue). After NY 384, NY 198 bends southeast, passing north of Forest Lawn Cemetery and south of Delaware Park Golf Course and the Buffalo Zoo. After entering an at-grade intersection with Parkside Avenue, NY 198 leaves Delaware Park and returns to a four-lane divided highway.

After the conversion, NY 198 interchanges with NY 5 (Main Street) just north of the Humboldt-Hospital station of Buffalo's Metro Rail. The expressway crosses under Kensington Avenue and continues southeast, entering the Masten section of Buffalo. There, NY 198 enters an interchange, merging, in both directions, with NY 33 (the Kensington Expressway). This merge marks the eastern terminus of the NY 198 designation.

History
The modern NY 198 corridor was originally served by Scajaquada Drive and Humboldt Parkway, two surface streets that linked Delaware Park to Humboldt Park (now Martin Luther King, Jr. Park). Scajaquada Drive began at Grant Street and went eastward through Delaware Park to Agassiz Circle. Here, it met Humboldt Parkway, which ran from NY 384 in Delaware Park to Fillmore Avenue at Humboldt Park by way of the modern Scajaquada and Kensington Expressway corridors. Construction of the Scajaquada Expressway began in the early 1960s. The first section of the freeway extended from Grant Street to Delaware Avenue and was completed by 1961. An extension west to the Niagara Thruway opened in 1962, at which time all of the expressways was designated as NY 198. The portion of Humboldt Parkway between Delaware Avenue and the Kensington Expressway was upgraded into a divided highway in the mid-1960s, at which time it became part of NY 198.

The Scajaquada Corridor Coalition, which includes Buffalo Olmsted Parks Conservancy, Buffalo Niagara Waterkeeper, Vision Niagara, Restore Our Community Coalition, SUNY Buffalo State, GObike Buffalo and the Grant Amherst Business Association, would like to restore parkways designed by Frederick Law Olmsted a century ago, and have proposed that the highway be downgraded to a pedestrian-friendly roadway more in harmony with the surrounding communities. The New York State Department of Transportation is investigating eight possible plans for the expressway based on suggestions by community groups over the last fifteen years. In September 2015, they published studies on how these plans would affect traffic in the surrounding neighborhoods. These plans are currently estimated to cost around $150 million. According to the state, there are environmental and economic studies, as required by federal law, currently underway on all eight plans which should be concluded in 2016 at which point public hearings will be held to determine the fate of the corridor. New guardrails have been installed, and the event has increased demands for the expressway to be converted to a parkway. Opposing parties are demanding that the speed limit be raised again and that the expressway remain an expressway. Mayor Byron Brown is on record as wanting the speed limit raised beyond Delaware Park in both directions as is Assemblyman Robin Schimminger, while some community groups and Assemblyman Sean Ryan have petitioned Governor Andrew Cuomo to issue an immediate order for conversion in violation of federal law regarding economic and environmental study requirements and construction.

Exit list

See also

References

External links

198
Transportation in Buffalo, New York
Transportation in Erie County, New York
Limited-access roads in New York (state)